Barnhardt is a surname. Notable people with the surname include:

Luther E. Barnhardt (1903–1980), American politician
Robert A. Barnhardt, American academic
Tommy Barnhardt (born 1963), American football player
Tyler Barnhardt (born 1993), American actor
Wilton Barnhardt (born 1960), American writer and journalist